The Mercedes-Benz W201 was the internal designation for the Mercedes 190 series sedans, a range of front-engine, rear drive, five passenger, four-door sedans manufactured over a single generation, from 1982 to 1993 as the company's first compact class automobile.

Designed by Bruno Sacco, head of styling at Mercedes-Benz from 1975 to 1999, the W201 debuted at the 1982 Paris Motor show. Manufactured in both Bremen and Sindelfingen, Germany, production reached 1,879,629 over its eleven-year model life.

The W201 introduced a 5-link rear suspension subsequently used in E and C class models, front and rear anti-roll bars, anti-dive and anti-squat geometry—as well as airbags, ABS brakes and seatbelt pretensioners. Its extensive use of light-weight high-strength steel enabled it to withstand a concrete barrier offset crash at 35 mph (56 km/h) without serious passenger injury or cabin deformation.

Mercedes introduced a performance variant, marketed as the 190 E 2.3-16V, at the 1983 Frankfurt Motor Show.

Background
From January 1974 to January 1982, Mercedes spent over £600 million researching and developing the W201, subsequently saying it was 'massively over-engineered'. The company began testing early prototypes in 1978, with final styling approved on 6 March 1979. The first prototypes based on that design were tested later that year, with pilot production beginning in February 1982, following engineering sign-off. The W201-based 190 was unveiled on 8 December 1982, and launched in Germany on 9 December 1982.  It was marketed in right-hand drive for the UK market from September 1983.

When difficulties prevented Daimler from manufacturing the W201 in Bremen, production began in Sindelfingen at a capacity of just 140,000 units per year. Bremen was subsequently cleared for W201 production, replacing the commercial production.

The 190 E (E for Einspritzung, or Fuel Injection) model uses the Bosch KE-Jetronic Multi-Point Fuel Injection to meter fuel instead of the carburetor of 190 models. Thanks to their fuel injection system and larger intake and exhaust valves, 190 E models made more power than non-fuel injected 190 models.

The last Mercedes-Benz 190E was manufactured on 17 May 1993.

Petrol models

In 1982, the first available models were the 190 and 190 E. Each was fitted with an M102  inline-4 engine. The 190 was fitted with an M102.921 engine producing  and the 190 E fitted with an M102.962 engine producing . In September 1983, the 190 E 2.3 (2,299 cc) was launched for the North American market only (although 190 E 2.3 was available for purchase in other countries later), fitted with a  M102.961 engine. This reduction in power was due to the emissions standards in the North American market at the time. The intake manifold, camshaft, and fuel injection system were refined in 1984, and the engine produced .

In 1985, the 190 E 2.3 now came fitted with the M102.985 engine, producing  until it was revised in 1987, now using the Bosch KE3-Jetronic Injection system, a different ignition system, and a higher compression ratio, producing .

The Frankfurt International Motor Show in September 1985 also marked the arrival of the first 190 equipped with an Inline-six engine. In the North American market, the 190 E 2.6 was sold until 1993, the end of the W201's production run. From 1992–1993 the 2.6 was available as a special "Sportline" model, with an upgraded suspension and interior. The 190 E 2.3 was sold until 1988, then went on a brief hiatus until it was sold again from 1991 until 1993.

In 1990, Mercedes Benz phased out the carburetor-equipped 190, replacing it with fuel-injected 190E 1.8. This model utilised a  M102.910 engine, with the same bore but shorter stroke than the M102.962, and produced the same  power output as the outgoing 190 model, albeit with only  torque.

Diesel models

The 190 D was available with three different engines. The 2.0 L inline-four engine was the base engine, and was never marketed in North America. A 2.2-liter version, with the same power as the 2.0 L, was introduced in September 1983. It was only available in model years 1984 and 1985, and only in the US and Canada. The 2.5 L inline-five engine was available in the late 1980s and early 1990s. The 2.5 L Turbo engine, sold in mainland Europe, but not the UK for many years, was available to American buyers only in 1987 and is now somewhat of a collectors item. The exterior of the 2.5 Turbo model is different from other models in that it has fender vents in the front passenger side fender to feed air to the turbocharger.

Limited editions

190 LE 
For the UK and Irish market a special edition 190 was produced for the 1993 model year. The car was given the badge name 190LE, though on the rear boot lid it read 190 E (on the left hand side of the lock) and LE on the right hand side. Roughly 1,000 cars were produced and each one came with a large A3 sized certificate giving each car a unique number.

The 190 LE was available in three colours only; Azzuro Blue (blue/purple), Brilliant Silver and Rosso Red (Burgundy). The Azzuro blue coloured cars came with a grey checked cloth interior, the silver coloured cars with a black checked cloth interior and the Rosso Red coloured cars with a biscuit/cream checked cloth interior.

The LE was equipped with extra features that had been options on the other models and were only available with the 1.8 or 2.0-litre engine. Both the 1.8 and 2.0-litre models were equipped with a standard electric tilt and slide steel sunroof, four electric windows, electric aerial, 8-hole alloy wheels, Blaupunkt Verona CR43 Radio/cassette player and walnut wood trim (as opposed to Zebrano wood). The 2.0-litre version had in addition rear headrests and a front armrest. The LE was nearly £3,500 cheaper than a 1.8-litre model of identical specification, and £2,000 cheaper than a 2.0-litre model.

No further options could be added to LE cars from the factory - though some were equipped with other dealer-installed items.

180 E 

In Australia, a limited run of 180 E Limited Edition cars could be purchased from October 1991 to March 1994. This was essentially a 1.8-litre 190 E with a very basic trim. This was achieved by taking out equipment and also by offsetting import duties with the now discontinued policy of export credits gained through using Australian-made components for the whole Mercedes-Benz range, such as suspension springs and windscreen glass. The 180 E deleted anti-lock brakes, power windows, climate control, electric seats, heated mirrors, cruise control and multi-speaker sound system; although power steering, air conditioning and central locking remained standard.

190 E Limited Edition 
In 1993, for the U.S. market, 2 LE models were offered, limited to 1,400 units (700 190 E 2.3 LE and 700 190 E 2.6 LE). Both the 2.3 and 2.6 Limited Editions had a rear badge deletion meaning that the "190E" and "2.3" or "2.6" chrome badges on  the trunk lid were not added. The 2.3 LE was only offered in Emerald Green while the 2.6 was only offered in Black. The 2.3 litre were only produced in Brilliant Emerald Pearl color. The 2.3 LE comes with 15-inch 8-hole alloy wheels, cream beige leather upholstery, burl walnut trim on the entire dash, fully electric front seats, rear headrests, and headlamp wipers with a washing system. The 2.6 litre Black Sportline included  Recaro seats with red inserts and red piping, rear matching headrests, carbon fiber trim, Sportline gear shift, a sportier steering wheel, headlight wipers, low profile tires, eight spoke rims, and a Sportline tuned suspension which added tighter handling and lowered the car by a quarter inch. The suspension was the same suspension as the 190E Cosworth.

190 E 2.3-16 and 2.5-16 Cosworth

In the late 1970s, Mercedes competed in rallying with the big V8-powered Coupés of the R107 Series, mainly the light-weight Mercedes 450 SLC 5.0. This project was known as project WAA by Cosworth. During this time, the Audi Quattro with its all-wheel drive system and a turbocharged engine was launched, making the 2.3-16V appear outclassed. With a continued desire to compete in motorsports with the 190, and also now an engine to do it with, Mercedes turned to the Deutsche Tourenwagen Meisterschaft (DTM) (German Touring Car Championship) motor sport series instead. Cars racing in this championship, however, had to be based on a roadgoing model. Mercedes therefore had to put into series production a 190 fitted with a detuned version of the Cosworth engine. The performance model was known as the 190 E 2.3-16V, and debuted in September at the 1983 Frankfurt Motor Show, after its reputation had already been established.

Engine

The Cosworth engine was based on the M102 four cylinder 2.3-litre 8-valve unit producing , already fitted to the 190 and E-Class. Cosworth developed the cylinder head. It was made from light alloy using Cosworth's unique casting process and brought with it dual overhead camshafts and four valves per cylinder, meaning 16 valves total which were developed to be the "largest that could practically be fitted into the combustion chamber".

The oversquare 95.50 x 80.25 mm bore and stroke dimensions ensured that the car could easily rev up to the 7,000 rpm redline. Acceleration from 0–100 km/h (62 mph) was in less than eight seconds, and the top speed was 230 km/h (143 mph).

The road-going version of the engine was reconfigured with reduced inlet and exhaust port sizes, different camshaft profiles, no dry sump configuration and Bosch K-Jetronic replacing the specialised Kugelfischer fuel injection. These changes helped bring power down to the required  specification, but still resulted in a "remarkably flexible engine, with a very flat torque curve and a wide power band". The heads for the engines were cast at Cosworth's Coscast foundry in Worcester and sent to Germany to be fitted to the rest of the engine, parts of which were different from the standard 2.3-litre engine including light pressed alloy pistons, and rings designed to withstand higher engine speeds, whilst con-rods, bearings and bearing caps were found to be strong enough as standard and left unaltered.

16V AMG power pack

2.5 L model

An enlarged 2.5 L engine replaced the 2.3 L in 1988. For the European market, the car delivered up to  without a catalytic converter. Cosworth also list the project code "WAB" for the development of the 2.5-16-valve head just as they do for the 2.3-16-valve head.

16v differences
Due to their performance, the 16-valve cars were different from the other 190 models. The body kit on the 2.3-16 and 2.5-16 reduced the drag coefficient to 0.32, one of the lowest CD values on a four-door saloon of the time, whilst also reducing lift at speed. The steering ratio was quicker and the steering wheel smaller than that on other 190s, whilst the fuel tank was enlarged from 55 to 70 L. The Getrag 5-speed manual gearbox was unique to the 16-valve and featured a dog-leg change pattern, shifting down and left for first. The gearchange quality was, however, noted as "notchy, balky", criticisms which weren't levelled at the BMW M3 (E30) which shared the same gearbox.  An oil cooler was fitted to ensure sufficient oil cooling for the inevitable track use many of these cars were destined for.

The strictly four-seater interior had standard sport size seats with strong side bolsters for front and rear passengers. Three extra dials - an oil temperature gauge, stopwatch and voltmeter - were included in the centre console. The 190 E 2.3-16 was available in only two colours, Blue-Black metallic (Pearl Black in the US), and Smoke Silver. The 2.5-16 added Almandine Red and Astral Silver.

All 2.3-16-valve 190 models are fitted with a Limited Slip Differential (LSD) as standard. They were also available with Mercedes' ASD system which was standard equipment on the 2.5-16v. The ASD is an electronically controlled, hydraulically locking differential which activates automatically when required. The electronic control allows varied amounts of differential lock from the standard 15% right up to 100%. It is not a traction control system however, and can only maximize traction rather than prevent wheel spin. Activation of the ASD system is indicated by an illuminating amber triangle in the speedometer.

The suspension on 16-valve models is modified from the standard 190 (W201). As well as being lower and stiffer, it has quicker dampers, larger anti-roll bars, harder bushings and hydraulic Self-levelling suspension (SLS) on the rear. This allows the rear ride height to remain constant even when the car is fully loaded.

The 1984 Nürburgring Race of Champions, featuring current and former F1 drivers at the wheel of identical 190 E's, was held at the inauguration of the new, shorter Nürburgring. A then unknown Ayrton Senna took first place.

Private Teams such as AMG later entered the 2.3-16 in touring cars races, especially the DTM. In the late 1980s, the 2.5-16 (never released in the United States) raced many times, against the similar BMW M3 and even the turbocharged Ford Sierra RS Cosworth.

Evolution models

Evolution I

With the debut of the BMW M3 Sport Evolution, the 190 E's direct competitor, it became obvious that the 2.5-16V model needed a boost in power in order to achieve better performance than its competitor. In March 1989, the 190 E 2.5-16 Evolution debuted at the Geneva Auto Show. The Evo I, as it came to be called, had a new rear spoiler and wider wheel arches. Many changes were made to under-the-skin components such as brakes and suspension. The car featured an adjustable suspension system allowing the ride height to be adjusted from an interior switch. All were intended to allow the Evolution cars to be even more effective around a track.

However, it had a redesigned engine of similar capacity but most importantly, a shorter stroke and bigger bore which would allow for a higher rev limit and improved generation of power. Additional changes stretch to improved rotating mass, improved lubrication system along with improved cam timing. Cosworth also list a project code "WAC" for the development of the short-stroke Evolution engine.

Only 502 units of the Evolution model were produced for homologation in compliance with the DTM rules. For those customers desiring even more performance, a PowerPack option engineered by AMG was available for DM 18,000. The PowerPack option included improved camshafts, a larger diameter throttle body, more responsive ignition and fuel management system as well as improved intake and exhaust systems.

Evolution II

In March 1990, at the Geneva Auto Show, the 190 E 2.5-16 Evolution II was shown.  This car retailed in 1990 for DM 136,720.

An obvious modification to the Evolution II was the radical body kit (designed by Prof. Richard Eppler from the University of Stuttgart) with a large adjustable rear wing, rear window spoiler, and Evolution II 17-inch alloy wheels. The kit served an aerodynamic purpose—it was wind tunnel tested to reduce drag to 0.29, while at the same time increasing downforce. Period anecdotes tell of BMW research and development chief, Wolfgang Reitzle, saying "the laws of aerodynamics must be different between Munich and Stuttgart; if that rear wing works, we'll have to redesign our wind tunnel." The anecdote claims that BMW did redesign its wind tunnel afterwards.

500 examples were painted in "blauschwarz" blue/black metallic. But the last two, numbers 501 and 502 were painted in astral silver making them the rarest of the Evolution models.

The Evo II had the shortest production run of the 190 series models with production starting in 1990 and ending in 1991.

Engines

Transmissions 

* Since August 1983. ** Getrag's dog-leg.

AMG models

AMG was not part of Mercedes-Benz when the 190 was first produced, but a separate racing and tuning company. As AMG had racing experience in the DTM, they were tuning all the factory petrol engines for the customers and 190 E was one of them. Engine tuning added  over the standard car. Along with that aerodynamic features were added to the cars such as rear spoilers and front splitters in order to improve high speed stability, alloy wheels and a leather interior.

190 E 3.2 AMG

The 190 E 3.2 AMG was the first model sold through AMG authorized re-seller with a Mercedes-Benz new car warranty. About 200 complete cars were made, in black or silver: they were very expensive (about DM 155,780). Besides 200 complete 190 E 3.2 AMG's, Mercedes-Benz sold AMG body kits and 3.2 L AMG engines separately, so there are 190's fitted with those features at the factory or retrofitted.

Mercedes 190 D BlueEFFICIENCY (2009)
The 190 D BlueEFFICIENCY is an experimental vehicle demonstrating the improvements made in Diesel engine technology over the last 20 years, in isolation from the equally profound changes in the safety and comfort of the car as a whole. The 190 D Blue EFFICIENCY accelerates from 0 to 100 km/h in 6.2 seconds, with fuel efficiency of 4.9 litres per 100 kilometres (NEDC). By comparison, the original car has the fuel efficiency of 7.3 litres per 100 kilometres. The 190 D BlueEFFICIENCY was also compared to C 250 CDI BlueEFFICIENCY, which has fuel efficiency of 5.1 litres per 100 kilometres via NEDC method, despite the modern C 250 CDI BlueEFFICIENCY being 385 kg heavier, 16 cm longer, and around 9 cm wider and higher than a 190.

Mercedes-Benz 190 E Elektro (1990)
The 190 E Elektro was a limited series of fully electric variants of the Mercedes-Benz W201. Back in May 1990, Mercedes revealed a fully electric 190 E at the Hannover Fair. This wasn't a typical concept for Mercedes as the carmaker wanted to use the 190E platform for testing different drive configurations and battery packs. These included mainly sodium-nickel chloride or sodium-sulphur batteries, which offered a much higher energy density than the era's more classic lead packs. At the 1991 Geneva Motor Show they even brought a more advanced version of the 190E ‘Electro’, showcasing their commitment to the project. The electric 190E retained the cabin space of the regular ICE model unaffected, as well as all its safety features. The Geneva show car featured two DC permanent magnet motors, one for each rear wheel, with a combined peak power output of 44 HP.  As for the driving range, the electric 190 E offered 110 km (68 miles) on a full charge. The Mercedes 190 E Electro used a sodium-nickel chloride battery and a regenerative braking system to help charge the pack during driving. Mercedes also took out many of the weight-intensive mechanical components in order to offset the weight penalty of the heavy batteries; the result was an electric car that weighed just 200 kg (440 lbs) more than the model it's based on. As for the driving range, Mercedes even participated in a large-scale field trial on the German island of Rügen between 1992 and 1996, with the support of the local government. They wanted to test electric cars and their powertrains in everyday conditions and Mercedes sent 10 hand-built 190 E Electro cars which featured various electric motors and battery configurations. Some of them had no transmission at all while others even featured a manual transmission in combination with their electric powertrains. Special recharging stations with solar collectors were also installed on the island to test the concept of EVs in a consistent -neutral manner. Overall a total of 60 cars and vans from different brands were involved in the EV trial. The cars were tested by different participants, including taxi drivers, who used them in their normal lives. According to Mercedes, there were hardly any problems, with the test cars showcasing excellent reliability. One of the vehicles even achieved a usage rate of 100,000 km in one year (62,000 miles).

References

Notes

Bibliography

General

Workshop manuals

External links

 Curbside Classic: Mercedes 190E (W201) – Das Beste oder….Baby! – retrospective of the W201
 www.mercedes-190.co.uk The original UK Mercedes w201 190 owners club & forum with members from all over the world offering a wealth of knowledge on all things Mercedes 190.
 MBUSA ISP Portal Mercedes Benz 201 Star Service Manuals

W201
W201
Rear-wheel-drive vehicles
Compact executive cars
Sedans
Cars introduced in 1982
1990s cars
Touring cars
Limousines
Cars discontinued in 1993